Marie Fisser was a  cargo ship that was built in 1937 by Lübecker Flender-Werke AG, Lübeck for German owners. She was seized by the Allies at Emden in May 1945, passed to the Ministry of War Transport (MoWT) and renamed Empire Conisborough. In 1946, she was passed to the Soviet Union and renamed Stepan Shaumian.

Description
The ship was built in 1937 by Lübecker Flender-Werke AG, Lübeck.

She had a GRT of 1,235 and a NRT of 685.

The ship was propelled by a compound steam engine which had two cylinders of 12 inches (33 cm) and two cylinders of 27 inches (70 cm) diameter by 27 inches (70 cm) stroke. The engine was built by Christiansen & Meyer, Hamburg.

History
Marie Fisser was built for Fisser & Van Dornum, Emden. Her port of registry was Emden and she used the Code Letters DGLG. In May 1945, Marie Fisser was seized by the Allies at Emden in a damaged condition. She was passed to the MoWT and renamed Empire Conisborough. Her port of registry was changed to London and she was placed under the management of the Dundee, Perth & London Steamship Co Ltd. She was allocated the Code Letters GMXM and the United Kingdom Official Number 180713. In 1946 she was passed to the Soviet Union and renamed Stepan Shaumian.

References

1937 ships
Ships built in Lübeck
Steamships of Germany
Merchant ships of Germany
World War II merchant ships of Germany
Ministry of War Transport ships
Empire ships
Steamships of the United Kingdom
Merchant ships of the United Kingdom
Steamships of the Soviet Union
Merchant ships of the Soviet Union
Soviet Union–United Kingdom relations
Germany–Soviet Union relations